Marsupiocrinus is an extinct genus of crinoids that lived from the Silurian to the Early Devonian in North America.

References

External links 
 Marsupiocrinus in the Paleobiology Database

Monobathrida
Prehistoric crinoid genera
Silurian crinoids
Devonian crinoids
Prehistoric echinoderms of North America
Silurian first appearances
Early Devonian genus extinctions